Greig Pickhaver AM (born 1948) is an actor, comedian and writer, who forms one half of the Australian satirical sports comedy duo Roy and HG as the excitable sports announcer HG Nelson. The award-winning duo teamed up in 1986 for the Triple J radio comedy program This Sporting Life, and were broadcast nationwide for 22 years, leading to several successful television spinoffs.<ref name="National Library of Australia">{{cite book|url=http://catalogue.nla.gov.au/Record/1997711/Holdings?lookfor=greig+pickhaver&max=2&offset=1&#details|title=Biographical cuttings on Greig Pickhaver, broadcaster and entertainer|via=National Library of Australia|access-date=2009-04-09}}</ref>

Personal life 
Pickhaver was born in Nuriootpa, South Australia to parents Gordon Pickhaver, and Beryl Skuce. His father was a World War II veteran who saw action in the Middle East and on the Kokoda Track and whose career was in the South Australian dairy industry. Pickhaver has three sisters (Jane, Anne and Mary) and a brother, Mark. Pickhaver was raised in Brighton, South Australia, up to the age of 15, and then the family moved to the suburb of Prospect, where he lived until the age of 22. He attended Oaklands Park Primary school, Brighton Secondary School, and for the last two years of high school Adelaide High School. He graduated from Flinders University and describes himself as dyslexic, having always relied heavily on memory and recall to achieve any academic results.

Radio career
Pickhaver performed in plays at school and at university. After a stint as a roadie for Australian rocker Billy Thorpe in the early 1970s, he became involved in the Melbourne theatre co-operative The Pram Factory. He moved into radio broadcasting on 3RRR in Melbourne and developed the HG Nelson character while performing in the Melbourne radio sports comedy show Punter To Punter in the early 1980s.

Pickhaver met John Doyle in 1985 while both were playing minor characters in an SBS TV show, and they teamed up as Roy and HG in 1986. Their radio comedy program This Sporting Life was broadcast initially in Sydney and later nationally on the Australian Broadcasting Corporation's Triple J youth radio network. It was continuously on-air for a 22-year period till 2008. This Sporting Life was added to the National Film and Sound Archive's Sounds of Australia registry in 2013.

Television and film career 
With John Doyle as Rampaging Roy Slaven, Pickhaver has appeared on television shows such as The Dream with Roy and HG, This Sporting Life, Blah Blah Blah, Club Buggery, The Channel Nine Show, Planet Norwich, Win Roy and HG's Money, The Monday Dump, The Nation Dumps, The Ice Dream with Roy and HG, The Cream, The Dream in Athens, The Memphis Trousers Half Hour, and Roy and H.G’s Russian Revolution.

Pickhaver hosted It's a Knockout from 2011 to 2012 alongside former Hi-5 star Charli Robinson and sports presenter Brad McEwan. Pickhaver joined Stephen Quartermain and Alisa Camplin for the Sochi Tonight show during the Sochi 2014 Winter Olympics in February 2014, and was featured in the SBS series Who Do You Think You Are? in September 2015. Many of his television opportunities have been "alternative" sports presentation coverages of the Summer or Winter Olympics.

Pickhaver starred in the cult 1993 Australian comedy film This Won't Hurt a Bit opposite Jacqueline McKenzie. In 2003, he appeared in the political comedy The Honourable Wally Norman.

Published works 
1989: Pants off, this sporting life, by Roy Slaven and H.G. Nelson
1994: Where it all went wrong [sound recording] : address delivered by H.G. Nelson, anti-smoking activist, to the National Press Club, Canberra on World No Tobacco Day, 1 June 19941994: Boys and balls, by Brian Nankervis; in the press box: Roy Slaven and H.G. Nelson
1996: Petrol, bait, ammo & ice, by H.G. Nelson, with a foreword by Roy Slaven; illustrated by Reg Mombassa
1999: It's yours for a sawn-off! : Sameranch's Sydney, by H.G. Nelson; illustrations by James de Vries
2006: The really stuffed guide to good food 2006, edited by H.G. Nelson
2008: Sprays, by H. G. Nelson
2011: My life in SHORTS'', by H. G. Nelson

Notes

References

External links

 HG Nelson ABC
 

Australian male comedians
Australian television personalities
Australian game show hosts
People from Nuriootpa, South Australia
Triple J announcers
Living people
Flinders University alumni
Members of the Order of Australia
Australian people of German descent
1948 births
People educated at Adelaide High School
Male actors from Adelaide